Romford railway station is an interchange station on the Great Eastern Main Line, serving the town of Romford in the London Borough of Havering, east London. It is also the northern terminus of a branch line to Upminster operated by London Overground. Its three-letter station code is RMF and it is in Travelcard Zone 6.

The station is currently managed by Transport for London.

History

East Anglia main line
From its inception, the Eastern Counties Railway (ECR) planned a route linking London and Norwich that would take it via Romford. Two routes were considered, that of the current line, and an alternative going through Ilford at Cranbrook Road, then passing near to Gidea Hall and crossing Romford Common approximately following the route of the current A12 before returning to the current railway alignment at Brentwood.

When the line was constructed, the first Romford station opened on 20 June 1839 as a single island platform located to the west of Waterloo Road, and formed the eastern terminus of the initial part of the Eastern Counties Railway from Mile End.

In 1860, the station was remodelled with platforms on each side of the line with access to the new station by a covered walkway from South Street to the London-bound platform and via an open slope and steps for the country-bound platform. Soon after this, the goods depot, which was situated to the south of the station, was connected to the Ind Coope brewery via a tunnel under the line. Other non-passenger traffic included goods for the Romford Gas Works and for cattle pens accessed from St Andrews Road, which were necessary due to the cattle market held in Romford every Wednesday.

The line became part of the Great Eastern Railway (GER) in 1862. It was grouped into the London and North Eastern Railway (LNER) in 1922.

Upminster branch

The construction of the Tilbury Docks in the 1850s gave expanded opportunities for rail traffic, and three proposals were made for a railway linking Romford to Tilbury. The LT&S had hoped to negotiate with the Great Eastern Railway to use their station, but concerns over fast trains led to the GER declining and a completely new station was built with a single platform and an entrance on the opposite side of South Street to the GER station. A footbridge was built to connect the two stations but was often closed during the day. 

In 1934, the entrance to the platform of the line to Upminster was closed and the access to the single platform was provided by the footbridge from the main station platforms.

In May 2015, the Upminster branch line transferred from Abellio Greater Anglia to London Overground.

Elizabeth line
In the 1930s increasing traffic on the line led to two additional tracks and platforms being added by the LNER on the north side, the line having been quadrupled to a point west of Romford previously in 1901. 

Electric trains started on the line from Liverpool Street to Shenfield in 1949, giving Romford 15 trains per hour to London during peak hours, and 6 trains per hour off-peak, a pattern that continued for over half a century.

In May 2015, the regular Shenfield stopping service transferred to TfL Rail.

In 2017 new  trains began entering service as Crossrail partially opened under the TfL Rail brand. New lifts, signage, help points, customer information screens and CCTV were installed. The upgrade works were completed in August 2022, after delays due to the COVID-19 pandemic. 

TfL Rail services were rebranded as the Elizabeth line on 24 May 2022.

Accidents and incidents 
On 29 December 1944, one person was killed and three were injured when, in darkness and heavy fog, a –London service passed two signals at danger on the approach to Romford and ran into the rear of a stationary freight train. One crew member on the goods train was killed instantly. The Chelmsford train driver was held responsible for the collision in a Ministry of War Transport report.
On 4 February 2010, two people standing on the platforms at Romford were injured when stone ballast was shed from a freight train passing through the station.

Services
As of December 2022, the typical Monday to Friday off-peak service from Romford is:

8 trains per hour (tph) to Paddington, calling at all stations (Elizabeth line)
2 tph to London Liverpool Street, calling at Stratford (Greater Anglia)
8 tph to Shenfield, calling at all stations (Elizabeth line)
2 tph to Upminster, calling at the only station,  (London Overground)
1 tph to  calling at Shenfield, then all stations (Greater Anglia)
1 tph to  calling at Shenfield, then all stations (Greater Anglia)

Connections
London Buses routes 5, 66, 86, 103, 128, 165, 174, 175, 193, 247, 248, 252, 294, 296, 347, 365, 370, 375, 496, 498, 499, school routes 647, 648, 651, 674, 686, and night routes N15 and N86 serve the station.

References

External links

 Excel file displaying National Rail station usage information for 2005/06 
 Old LTSR entrance after conversion

Railway stations in the London Borough of Havering
DfT Category C2 stations
Former Great Eastern Railway stations
Former London, Tilbury and Southend Railway stations
Railway stations in Great Britain opened in 1839 
Railway stations in Great Britain opened in 1893 
Greater Anglia franchise railway stations
Railway stations served by London Overground
Railway stations served by the Elizabeth line
Railway station